Hiroden Streetcar route #1 "Hiroshima Station – Hiroshima Port Route" runs between Hiroshima Station and Hiroshima Port.

Overview

Lines
Horoden Streetcar route #1 is made up from two lines, and both lines are linked up with each other at Kamiya-cho-Higashi station. The train goes straight through from each side.

 █ Hiroden Main Line
 █ Hiroden Ujina Line

Stations

References 

1